Welcome Back to School (also known as Off to School, I'm Going to School; Oh, I'll Go to School; and Going to School;  Romanization: Hakgyo danyeo ogesseubnida) was a 2014 South Korean variety program where celebrities attended a selected high school as students for 3 days. It starred M.I.B's Kang-nam and Kim Jeong-hoon as fixed members. Despite a few changes in its time slot over the show's history, it aired on JTBC on Tuesdays at 9:30 pm KST from July 12, 2014 to November 3, 2015.

Episode summary

References

External links
Official website 
Official Facebook page 
Korean Wikipedia 

2014 South Korean television series debuts
Korean-language television shows
JTBC original programming
South Korean variety television shows
South Korean high school television series